ATCS may refer to:

 Academy for Technology and Computer Science, part of high school Bergen County Academies in New Jersey, United States
 Advanced Train Control System, a railroad safety and monitoring system
 Areal Traffic Control System
 Asian Touring Car Series, a touring car racing series in southeast Asia